Son of the Northeast (or Look Isan, also Child of the Northeast) is a 1982 historical drama film set in 1930s Isan, or northeastern Thailand. The film is directed by Vichit Kounavudhi and is based on a S.E.A. Write Award-winning book by Kampoon Boonthavee. Filmed in a documentary style, the story follows a tight-knit group of Isan subsistence farmers as they struggle against drought and other depredations.

External links

1982 films
1982 drama films
Thai-language films
Films based on Thai novels
Isan
Thai national heritage films
Thai drama films